The Billboard Live Music Awards (previously known as the Billboard Touring Conference and Awards until 2018) is an annual meeting sponsored by Billboard magazine that honors the top international live entertainment industry artists and professionals. Established in 2004, it has thus been described as "part industry conference, part awards show".

The last such annual event appears to have been in 2019; it is unclear if the conference and awards have, or will, continue past that year.

Many of the awards are based on Billboards Boxscore chart tracking concert, comedy and other live entertainment attendance and gate receipts, and on real box office performance.  As a result, the awards often equate to commercial success. The "top tour" superlative award is also given on the basis of fan polls. The "Legend of Live" and Humanitarian awards are given to individuals for their ongoing contributions to the live entertainment touring industry.

History
The conference and awards are held in November of each year, traditionally at the Roosevelt Hotel in Midtown Manhattan in New York City but, since 2016, at hotels in the Los Angeles area.  The conference usually takes place over two days and is attended by figures from the music and concert industry. Each year features a keynote speaker from the performance industry, who in the past have included the likes of Gene Simmons of Kiss and 3 Doors Down.

While recorded music has an established awards structure headed by the Grammy Awards and also featuring the American Music Awards and the MTV Video Music Awards, live performance music has not had the same.  The Billboard Touring Awards are an attempt to fill that gap.  Billboard previously attempted to enter the awards arena for recorded music with the charts-based Billboard Music Award, which lasted from 1990 through 2006, returning in 2011.  Those awards featured two slots for Concert Venue Award and Touring Venue Award, but were not otherwise live-performance-based.

Award names and awards given themselves have varied somewhat each year, with for example the Top Comedy Tour and Concert Marketing and Promotion Awards being added in 2007 and the Fans Choice being added in 2008, both being determined by fan vote.  There are typically three nominees in each category.

Repeat winners in the awards have been common, with country artist Kenny Chesney winning Top Package Tour six consecutive years through 2009 and Bonnaroo Music Festival winning four times as well starting in 2004.

Winners

2019
The sixteenth annual edition of the awards took place on November 5, 2019, at the Montage Beverly Hills in Beverly Hills, California.   
Legend of Live + Tour of the Year: P!nk, Beautiful Trauma World Tour
Tour of the Summer: Hootie & the Blowfish, Group Therapy Tour
Top Boxscore: Spice Girls - Spice World - 2019 Tour, Wembley Stadium, London, England - June 13–15, 2019
Top Grossing: Ed Sheeran
Top Manager: Joyce Smyth (Rolling Stones)
Top Concert & marketing Promotions: Verizon Up x Shawn Mendes x Camila Cabello Customer Loyalty Promotion
Top Arena: Madison Square Garden - New York City
Top Agency: WME 
Chip Hopper Award: Sara Bollwinkel, Agent at Paradigm

2018
The fifteenth annual edition of the (newly named) awards took place on November 13, 2018, at the Montage Beverly Hills in Beverly Hills, California, in proceedings hosted by comedian Roy Wood Jr.
 Top World Tour: Ed Sheeran, ÷ Tour 
 Top U.S. Tour: Taylor Swift, Reputation Stadium Tour
 Top Tour & Top Draw: Ed Sheeran, ÷ Tour 
 Top Package: not given
 Breakthrough Artist: Post Malone
 Top Comedy Tour: Kevin Hart
 Top Festival: Outside Lands Music and Arts Festival
 Top Promoter: Live Nation Entertainment
 Top Independent Promoter (Worldwide): OCESA-CIE 
 Top Agency: CAA  
 Top Manager: Dre London, Post Malone
 Top Boxscore: U2, Estadio do Morumbi, Sao Paulo, October 19–25, 2017
 Top Arena: Madison Square Garden, New York
 Top Club: Brooklyn Steel, Brooklyn 
 Top Amphitheater: Hollywood Bowl, Los Angeles 
 Top Venue (Under 10,000 seats): Radio City Music Hall, New York 
 Top Venue (Under 5,000 Seats): The Colosseum at Caesars Palace, Las Vegas
 Concert Marketing and Promotion: Khalid and Hollister Co.
 Humanitarian: not given
 Legend Of Live: John Mayer

2017
The fourteenth annual edition of the awards took place on November 15, 2017, at the Montage Beverly Hills in Beverly Hills, California, in proceedings hosted by Hasan Minhaj.
 Top Tour: Guns N' Roses, Not in This Lifetime... Tour 
 Top Draw: Guns N' Roses
 Top Package: not given
 Breakout Artist: Lil Uzi Vert
 Top Comedy Tour: Jerry Seinfeld
 Top Festival: Coachella Valley Music and Arts Festival
 Top Promoter: Live Nation Entertainment
 Top Independent Promoter (Worldwide): Another Planet Entertainment 
 Top Agency: Paradigm Talent Agency  
 Top Manager: Pat Corcoran, Chance the Rapper
 Top Boxscore: U2, Stade de France, Saint-Denis, July 25–26, 2017
 Top Arena: T-Mobile Arena, Las Vegas 
 Top Club: House of Blues, Boston 
 Top Amphitheater: Hollywood Bowl, Los Angeles 
 Top Venue (Under 10,000 seats): Radio City Music Hall, New York 
 Top Venue (Under 5,000 Seats): The Colosseum at Caesars Palace, Las Vegas
 Concert Marketing & Promotion Award: Foo Fighters' Cal Jam and North American Concrete and Gold Tour with Capital One
 Humanitarian: Everytown for Gun Safety 
 Legend Of Live: Tim McGraw and Faith Hill

2016
The thirteenth annual Billboard Touring Awards took place on a single day, November 9, 2016, this time at the SLS Hotel in Beverly Hills, California.
 Top Tour: Bruce Springsteen & the E Street Band, The River Tour 2016 
 Top Draw: Coldplay
 Top Package: Justin Bieber Purpose Tour featuring Moxie Raia and Post Malone 
 Breakthrough: Adele
 Top Comedy Tour: Kevin Hart
 Top Festival: Coachella Valley Music and Arts Festival
 Top Promoter: Live Nation Entertainment
 Top Independent Promoter (U.S.): Another Planet Entertainment
 Top Independent Promoter (International): SJM Concerts 
 Top Agency: Creative Artists Agency  
 Top Manager: Maverick Management 
 Top Boxscore: Coldplay – Wembley Stadium (June 15–16 & 18–19)
 Top Arena: The O2, London 
 Top Club: House of Blues, Boston 
 Top Amphitheater: BB&T Pavilion, Camden, New Jersey 
 Top Venue (Under 10,000 seats): Radio City Music Hall 
 Top Venue (Under 5,000 Seats): The Colosseum at Caesars Palace, Las Vegas
 Concert Marketing & Promotion Award: Chance the Rapper
 Golden Circle: Brian Murphy, Goldenvoice/AEG Live 
 Humanitarian: Scooter Braun 
 Legend Of Live: Bon Jovi

2015
The twelfth annual Billboard Touring Awards took place on a single day, November 19, 2015, at the Roosevelt Hotel in New York City.
 Top Tour: One Direction, On the Road Again Tour
 Top Draw: One Direction
 Top Boxscore: Fare Thee Well: Celebrating 50 Years of the Grateful Dead – Soldier Field (July 3–5)
 Top Comedy Tour: Kevin Hart
 Top Package: Kenny Chesney, The Big Revival Tour
 Breakthrough: Ed Sheeran
 Top Festival: Coachella Valley Music and Arts Festival
 Top Arena: O2 Arena, London
 Top Venue (Under 10,000 seats): Radio City Music Hall, New York
 Top Venue (Under 5,000 seats): The Colosseum at Caesars Palace, Las Vegas
 Top Club: House of Blues, Boston
 Top Amphitheater: The Gorge Amphitheatre, George, Washington
 Top Promoter: Live Nation
 Top Independent Promoter (U.S.): Another Planet Entertainment, San Francisco
 Top Independent Promoter (International): Frontier Touring Company, Australia and New Zealand
 Top Agency: Creative Artists Agency
 Top Manager: Modest! Management
 Humanitarian Award: Hugh Evans
 Concert Marketing & Promotion Award: Imagine Dragons/Southwest Airlines
 Legend of Live: Bob Seger
 Golden Circle Award: Barbara Marx Hubbard

2014
The eleventh annual Billboard Touring Awards took place on over two days in November 19–20, 2014, at the Roosevelt Hotel in New York City.
 Top Tour: One Direction, Where We Are Tour
 Top Draw: One Direction
 Top Boxscore: The Rolling Stones – Tokyo Dome (February 26, March 4, 6)
 Top Comedy Tour: Jeff Dunham
 Top Package: Katy Perry's Prismatic Tour, featuring Capital Cities, Kacey Musgraves, Tegan & Sarah, Becky G
 Breakthrough: Florida Georgia Line
 Top Festival: Coachella Valley Music and Arts Festival
 Top Arena: O2 Arena, London
 Top Venue (Under 10,000 seats): Radio City Music Hall, New York
 Top Venue (Under 5,000 seats): The Colosseum at Caesars Palace, Las Vegas
 Top Club: House of Blues, Boston
 Top Amphitheater: Molson Canadian Amphitheatre, Toronto
 Top Promoter: Live Nation
 Top Independent Promoter (U.S.): C3 Presents, Austin, Texas
 Top Independent Promoter (International): T4F, Sao Paulo, Brazil
 Top Agency: Creative Artists Agency
 Top Manager: Modest! Management
 Humanitarian Award: Light of Day Foundation
 Concert Marketing & Promotion Award: Billy Joel/Citibank at Madison Square Garden
 Legend of Live: Lionel Richie
 Golden Circle Award: Ron Delsener

2013
The tenth annual Billboard Touring Awards took place on over two days in November 13 and 14, 2013, at the Roosevelt Hotel in New York City.
 Top Tour: Bon Jovi, Because We Can Tour
 Top Draw: Bon Jovi
 Top Boxscore: P!nk – Rod Laver Arena, Melbourne (July 7-August 26)
 Top Comedy Tour: Jeff Dunham
 Top Package: Taylor Swift's Red Tour, featuring Ed Sheeran, Joel Crouse, Brett Eldredge, Florida Georgia Line and Casey James
 Breakthrough: One Direction
 Top Festival: Coachella Valley Music and Arts Festival
 Top Arena: O2 Arena, London
 Top Venue (Under 10,000 seats): Radio City Music Hall, New York
 Top Venue (Under 5,000 seats): The Colosseum at Caesars Palace, Las Vegas
 Top Club: House of Blues, Orlando, Florida
 Top Amphitheater: The Gorge, George, Washington
 Top Promoter: Live Nation
 Top Independent Promoter (U.S.): C3 Presents, Austin, Texas
 Top Independent Promoter (International): T4F, Sao Paulo, Brazil
 Top Agency: Creative Artists Agency
 Top Manager: Bon Jovi Management
 Humanitarian Award: Marcie Allen (President of MAC Presents)
 Eventful Fans' Choice Award: Bon Jovi
 Concert Marketing & Promotion Award: The Rolling Stones, 50 & Counting Tour 
 Legend of Live: George Strait
 Hauler of the Decade Award: Vans Warped Tour

2012
The ninth annual Billboard Touring Awards again took place on over two days in November 2012 at the Roosevelt Hotel in New York City, despite the aftereffects of Superstorm Sandy.
 Top Tour: Roger Waters, The Wall Live
 Top Draw: Bruce Springsteen, Wrecking Ball Tour
 Top Package: Brothers of the Sun Tour, featuring  Kenny Chesney, Tim McGraw, Grace Potter & the Nocturnals, and Jake Owen
 Breakthrough: Lady Antebellum
 Top Comedy Tour: Jeff Dunham
 Top Boxscore: Coachella Valley Music and Arts Festival, April 13–22
 Top Festival: Coachella Valley Music and Arts Festival
 Top Arena: O2 Arena, London
 Top Venue (Under 10,000 seats): Radio City Music Hall, New York
 Top Venue (Under 5,000 seats): The Colosseum at Caesars Palace, Las Vegas
 Top Club (Based on attendance): 9:30 Club, Washington, D.C.
 Top Amphitheater: Nikon at Jones Beach Theater, Wantagh, New York
 Top Promoter: Live Nation Entertainment
 Top Independent Promoter (U.S.): C3 Presents, Austin, Texas
 Top Independent Promoter (International): T4F, Sao Paulo, Brazil
 Top Agency: William Morris Endeavor Entertainment
 Top Manager: Mark Fenwick
 Concert Marketing & Promotion Award: Demi Lovato/Hallmark
 Humanitarian Award: Apollo Theater
 Eventful Fan's Choice: Lady Gaga
 Creative Content: Michael Jackson: The Immortal World Tour by Cirque du Soleil
 Road Warrior: Kenny Chesney
 Legend of Scribe: Ray Waddell
 Legend of Live: Neil Diamond

2011
The eighth annual Billboard Touring Awards took place on over two days in November 2011 at the Roosevelt Hotel in New York City.
 Top Tour: U2, 360° Tour
 Top Draw: U2, 360° Tour
 Top Package: Kenny Chesney's Goin' Coastal Tour, with Zac Brown Band, Uncle Kracker, Billy Currington 
 Breakthrough: Jason Aldean
 Top Comedy Tour: Jeff Dunham
 Top Boxscore: Take That, Wembley Stadium, London, June 30 – July 9
 Top Festival: Coachella Valley Music and Arts Festival
 Top Arena: O2 Arena, London
 Top Venue (Under 10,000 seats): Radio City Music Hall, New York
 Top Venue (Under 5,000 seats): The Colosseum at Caesars Palace, Paradise, Nevada
 Top Club (Based on attendance): 9:30 Club, Washington, D.C.
 Top Amphitheater: Comcast Center, Mansfield, Massachusetts
 Top Promoter: Live Nation Entertainment
 Top Independent Promoter (U.S.): C3 Presents, Austin, Texas
 Top Independent Promoter (International): SJM Concerts, London
 Top Agency: William Morris Endeavor Entertainment
 Top Manager: Front Line Management Group
 Apple Award: Perry Farrell
 Concert Marketing & Promotion Award: Taylor Swift's Speak Now World Tour 2011 sponsored by CoverGirl 
 Humanitarian Award: Coran Capshaw
 Eventful Fan's Choice: Bon Jovi 
 Legend of Live: Journey

2010
The seventh annual Billboard Touring Awards took place on November 3 and 4, 2010, at the Sheraton Hotel in New York City, NY.
 Top Tour: U2, 360° Tour
 Top Draw: U2, 360° Tour
 Top Package: Taylor Swift with Kellie Pickler and Gloriana
 Breakthrough: Lady Gaga
 Top Comedy Tour: Dane Cook
 Top Boxscore: AC/DC, ANZ Stadium, Sydney, Feb. 18, 20, 22
 Top Festival: Download Festival, Donington Park, Castle Donington, U.K. June 11–13
 Top Arena: O2 Arena, London
 Top Venue (Under 10,000 seats): Radio City Music Hall, NYC
 Top Venue (Under 5,000 seats): The Colosseum at Caesars Palace, Paradise
 Top Club (Based on attendance): 9:30 Club, Washington, D.C.
 Top Amphitheater: Hollywood Bowl, Los Angeles
 Top Promoter: Live Nation
 Top Independent Promoter (U.S.): C3 Presents, Austin, Texas
 Top Independent Promoter (International): T4F, Sao Paulo, Brazil
 Top Agency: Creative Artists Agency
 Top Manager: Creative Artists Agency
 Creative Content Award: Yo Gabba Gabba Live!
 Concert Marketing & Promotion Award: Lady Gaga/Virgin Mobile
 Humanitarian Award: Jack Johnson
 Eventful Fan's Choice: Metallica
 Legend of Live: Rush

2009
The sixth annual Billboard Touring Awards took place November 4 and 5, 2009, at the Roosevelt Hotel in New York City.  The winners were:

 Top Tour: Madonna, Sticky & Sweet Tour
 Top Draw: Madonna, Sticky & Sweet Tour
 Top Package: Kenny Chesney, Sun City Carnival Tour with Miranda Lambert, Lady Antebellum, Sugarland and Montgomery Gentry
 Breakthrough: Il Divo
 Top Comedy Tour: Dane Cook, Globo Thermo Tour 2009
 Top Boxscore: U2 360° Tour at Croke Park in Dublin
 Top Festival: Oxegen at Naas, County Kildare, Ireland
 Top Arena: O2 arena, London
 Top Venue (Under 10,000 seats): Radio City Music Hall, New York City
 Top Venue (Under 5,000 seats): The Colosseum at Caesars Palace, Paradise
 Top Club: 9:30 Club, Washington, D.C.
 Top Amphitheatre: Comcast Center, Mansfield, Massachusetts
 Top Promoter: Live Nation
 Top Independent Promoter (U.S.): Jam Productions, Chicago
 Top Independent Promoter (International): Time For Fun, Sao Paulo, Brazil
 Top Manager: Guy Oseary (Madonna's manager)
 Concert Marketing & Promotion Award: Keith Urban, Escape Together World Tour 2009 with KC Masterpiece & Kingsford
 Top Agency: Creative Artists Agency
 Humanitarian: Kevin Lyman, creator of the Warped Tour
 Eventful Fans' Choice Award: Jonas Brothers World Tour 2009
 Legend of Live: Ozzy Osbourne

2008
The fifth annual Billboard Touring Awards took place November 20, 2008 in New York City.

 Top Tour: Bruce Springsteen and the E Street Band, Magic Tour
 Top Draw: Bruce Springsteen and the E Street Band, Magic Tour
 Fans Choice: Kenny Chesney, Poets and Pirates Tour
 Top Package: Kenny Chesney, Poets and Pirates Tour
 Breakthrough: Miley Cyrus, Hannah Montana/Miley Cyrus Best of Both Worlds Tour
 Top Boxscore: Spice Girls, Return of the Spice Girls, O2 arena, London, December 15 – January 22 (17 shows)
 Top Comedy Tour: Katt Williams
 Top Festival: Bonnaroo Music Festival
 Top Arena: Madison Square Garden
Top Amphitheater: Comcast Center in Mansfield, Mass.
Top Venue (Under 10,000 seats): Radio City Music Hall, New York City
 Top Venue (Under 5,000 seats): The Colosseum at Caesars Palace
Top Club: House of Blues, Dallas
Concert Marketing & Promotion: Jonas Brothers/Burger King, Burning Up Tour
 Creative Content: Walking with Dinosaurs – the Live Experience Tour
 Humanitarian: Jon Bon Jovi/Philadelphia Soul Charitable Foundation
 Road Warrior: Widespread Panic
 Legend of Live: The Allman Brothers Band

2007
The 2007 awards were held on November 15, 2007.  Awards were based on box office performance from January 1, 2007, through September 30, 2007.

2006
The 2006 awards were held on November 9, 2006, in New York City.

2005
The 2005 awards were termed the Billboard Roadworks '05 Touring Awards.

2004
The first annual Billboard Touring Awards were held November 8–9, 2004, at the Roosevelt Hotel in New York City, as the culmination of the first Billboard Backstage Pass Conference.  The winners were announced in advance of the awards ceremony. The awards were not well known or publicized much during this time.

 Top Tour: Madonna, Re-Invention World Tour
 Top Draw Award: Prince, Musicology Tour
 Top Small Venue Tour: Josh Groban
 Breakthrough: Linkin Park
 Top Boxscore: Red Hot Chili Peppers, By the Way tour, Hyde Park, London
 Top Arena: Madison Square Garden, New York City
 Top Amphitheater: Tweeter Center for the Performing Arts, Mansfield, Massachusetts
 Top Club: House of Blues, Chicago
 Top Festival: Bonnaroo Music Festival, Manchester, Tennessee
 Top Manager: Caresse Henry (for Madonna)
 Top Promoter: Clear Channel Entertainment
 Top Indy Promoter: Jam Productions
 Top Agency: Creative Artists Agency
 Humanitarian: Clear Channel Entertainment
 Legend of Live: Michael Cohl

References

Concert tours
Billboard awards